Alexander Khatuntsev (born 11 February 1985) is a Russian former professional road bicycle racer. For his final season as a professional in 2012, he rode for UCI Professional Continental Team .

Major results 

2002
 1st  Team pursuit, UCI Junior Track World Championships (with Mikhail Ignatiev, Serguei Ulakov & Ilya Krestianinov)
2003
 1st  Individual pursuit, UCI Junior Track World Championships
 1st  Individual pursuit, UEC European Junior Track Championships
 2nd  Team pursuit, UEC European Under-23 Track Championships
2004
 1st Overall Tour of South China Sea
1st Stages 1 & 6
 1st  Mountains classification, Tour Nord-Isère
 3rd  Team pursuit, UEC European Under-23 Track Championships
2005
 1st  Team pursuit, UEC European Under-23 Track Championships
 1st Overall GP Sochi
1st Stages 1, 4 & 5
 1st Boucles de la Soule
 2nd Grand Prix of Moscow
 8th Overall Tour de Serbie
2006
 1st  Road race, National Road Championships
 1st Overall Tour of South China Sea
1st Young rider classification
1st Stages 3 & 6
 1st Overall Five Rings of Moscow
1st Stage 4
 1st Grand Prix of Moscow
 1st Boucle de l'Artois
 1st Stage 1 Tour of Hainan
 2nd  Team pursuit, UEC European Under-23 Track Championships
 2nd Overall GP Sochi
1st Stages 1, 2 & 5
 2nd Overall Tour de Normandie
 3rd  Road race, UCI World Under-23 Road Championships
 3rd Overall Tour de Serbie
1st Stage 5
 3rd Memorial Cimurri
 3rd E.O.S. Tallinn GP
2007
 3nd Route Adélie
 6th Circuito de Getxo
2009
 1st Grand Prix of Moscow
 4th Overall Five Rings of Moscow
1st Stage 4
 7th Grand Prix of Donetsk

References

External links 

1985 births
Living people
Russian male cyclists
Cyclists at the 2004 Summer Olympics
Olympic cyclists of Russia
Sportspeople from Voronezh
Russian track cyclists